Year 197 (CXCVII) was a common year starting on Saturday (link will display the full calendar) of the Julian calendar. At the time, it was known as the Year of the Consulship of Magius and Rufinus (or, less frequently, year 950 Ab urbe condita). The denomination 197 for this year has been used since the early medieval period, when the Anno Domini calendar era became the prevalent method in Europe for naming years.

Events 
 By place 

 Roman Empire 
 February 19 – Battle of Lugdunum: Emperor Septimius Severus defeats the self-proclaimed emperor Clodius Albinus at Lugdunum (modern Lyon). Albinus commits suicide; legionaries sack the town.
 Septimius Severus returns to Rome and has about 30 of Albinus's supporters in the Senate executed. After his victory he declares himself the adopted son of the late Marcus Aurelius.
 Septimius Severus forms new naval units, manning all the triremes in Italy with heavily armed troops for war in the East. His soldiers embark on an artificial canal between the Tigris and Euphrates.
 Legio I, II, and III Parthica are levied by Septimius Severus for his Parthian campaign.
 The Roman army marches east to repel a Parthian invasion of Mesopotamia; they loot the royal palace at Ctesiphon and capture an enormous number of its inhabitants as slaves.
 Septimius Severus reconstitutes the Province of Mesopotamia under an equestrian governor commanding two legions.
 Septimius Severus, who had spared the Senate at the beginning of his reign, now excludes it from controlling the Roman empire by declaring a military dictatorship.

 Asia 
 Battle of Wancheng: Zhang Xiu launches a surprise attack at Cao Cao.
 Yuan Shu declares himself emperor of the short-lived Zhong dynasty.
 Sansang becomes ruler of the Korean kingdom of Goguryeo.

 By topic 

 Art and Science 
 Galen's major work on medicines, Pharmacologia, is published.

 Religion 
 A Christian council is held in Edessa.

Births 
 Cao, Chinese empress of the Han Dynasty (d. 260)
 Deng Ai, Chinese general of the Cao Wei state (d. 264)

Deaths 
 February 19 – Clodius Albinus, Roman general and usurper 
 Cao Ang (or Zixiu), eldest son of Cao Cao (b. 177)
 Dian Wei, Chinese general serving under Cao Cao
 Gaius Julius Erucius Clarus Vibianus, Roman politician
 Gogukcheon of Goguryeo, Korean ruler of Goguryeo
 Guo Si (or Guo Duo), Chinese general and regent 
 Li Jue, Chinese general serving under Dong Zhuo
 Liu Chong, Chinese nobleman and Prince of Chen
 Titus Flavius Claudius Sulpicianus, Roman statesman
 Yang Feng, Chinese general serving under Li Jue

References